Yongkang railway station may refer to the following stations:
Yongkang railway station (Taiwan)
Yongkang railway station (Zhejiang)